Norman Daniels (born 1942) is an American political philosopher and philosopher of science, political theorist, ethicist, and bioethicist at Harvard University and the Harvard T.H. Chan School of Public Health.  Before his career at Harvard, Daniels had built his career as a medical ethicist at Tufts University in Medford, Massachusetts, and at Tufts University School of Medicine, also in Boston.

Teaching positions
Until his retirement at the end of June 2017, Daniels is Mary B. Saltonstall Professor of Population Ethics and Professor of Ethics and Population Health in the Department of Global Health and Population at the Harvard T.H. Chan School of Public Health in Boston.

Previously, and for 33 years, he had taught political philosophy at Tufts University in Medford, Massachusetts.  At Tufts University, he had been Goldthwaite Professor and chair of the philosophy department, and at Tufts University School of Medicine, he was professor of medical ethics (1969–2002).

Education
 1970 - Harvard University, Ph.D. (Philosophy), awarded the Plympton Dissertation Prize, 1971
 1966 - Balliol College, Oxford, B.A. (equivalent to M.A. in USA) (Philosophy and Psychology, First Honors)
 1964 - Wesleyan University, B.A. (English, Summa cum Laude)

Personal life
Daniels is married to neuro-psychologist Anne Lacy Daniels (Ed.D.).  They have one son, Noah M. Daniels, formerly a postdoctoral research associate at MIT, is now Assistant Professor in the Department of Computer Science and Statistics of The University of Rhode Island.

With Jared Israel, Daniels co-chaired the Harvard chapter of the Students for a Democratic Society in 1969.

In a public letter to his fraternity brothers at Wesleyan, Daniels wrote: "At Harvard, I ended up co-chair of SDS and gave the speech on the steps of University Hall April 9, 1969, that began the take-over of that administration building and thus led to the Harvard Strike. I would have been fired as a teaching fellow, so I followed my advisors advice and quit that position to take a part-time job at Tufts, teaching philosophy of science and political philosophy. I stayed 33 years."

Professional affiliations
 Formerly Goldthwaite Professor and chair of the philosophy department at Tufts University and professor of medical ethics at Tufts Medical School, 1969–2002
 Fellow, Hastings Center
 Member, Institute of Medicine
 Founding member of the National Academy of Social Insurance
 Member, International Society for Equity in Health
 Member, Medicare Coverage Advisory Commission (Bill Clinton administration)
 Member, Ethics Working Group of the Clinton White House Health Care Task Force (Spring 1993)
 Member, Advisory Board of the CIHR-Institute of Population and Public Health (Fall 2009)
 Member, Ethics Advisory Board of the Centers for Disease Control (Fall 2009 - Fall 2012)
 Member, Public Health Service Expert Panel on Cost Effectiveness and Clinical Preventive Medicine
 Member, National Academy of Social Insurance study panel on the social role of Medicare
 Member, Century Fund task force on Medicare reform

Consulting
 He has traveled widely and internationally, consulting with organizations, commissions, and governments in the U.S. and abroad on issues of justice and health policy
 Norman Daniels and Dan W. Brock consulted with Hillary Clinton on Bill Clinton's healthcare taskforce in 1993.
 Consultant, United Nations
 Consultant, World Health Organization
 President's Commission for the Study of Ethical Problems in Medicine

Awards
 Member, Institute of Medicine
 Fellow, The Hastings Center
 Founding Member, National Academy of Social Insurance
 Founding Member, International Society for Equity in Health
 Founding Member, National Cancer Policy Board, established by the Institute of Medicine and the Commission on the Life Sciences (served He served four years)
 Founding Member, Advisory Board of the Open Society Foundation project on Medicine as a Profession, and on the International Bioethics Advisory Board of PAHO. He served recently on an IOM Committee on the use of Cost Effectiveness Analysis in regulatory contexts.

Fellowships and grants
 Greenwall Foundation
 National Endowment for the Humanities
 National Institutes of Health
 National Library of Medicine
 National Science Foundation
 Retirement Research Foundation
 Robert Wood Johnson Foundation
 Investigator Award in Health Policy Research, Robert Wood Johnson Foundation, 1997 (for the period 1998-2001)
 "Limit-Setting in Managed Care and Other Health Delivery Systems: Legitimacy, Fair Process, and the Goals of Health Care Reform"
 Rockefeller Foundation grant, international adaptation of the benchmarks

Books
 Thomas Reid's`Inquiry': the Geometry of Visibles and the Case for Realism (1974; Stanford, 1989)
 Reading Rawls: Critical Studies on Rawls' 'A Theory of Justice' (1975; Stanford, 1989)
 Just Health Care (Cambridge, 1985)
 Am I My Parents' Keeper? An Essay on Justice Between the Young and the Old (Oxford, 1988)
 Seeking Fair Treatment: From the AIDS Epidemic to National Health Care Reform (New York: Oxford University Press, 1995)
 Justice and Justification: Reflective Equilibrium in Theory and Practice (Cambridge University Press, 1996)
 (with Donald Light and Ronald Caplan) Benchmarks of Fairness for Health Care Reform (Oxford, 1996)
 (with Allen Buchanan, Dan Brock, and Dan Wikler)  From Chance to Choice: Genetics and Justice. Cambridge University Press. . (Cambridge, 2000)
 (with Bruce Kennedy and Ichiro Kawachi) Is Inequality Bad for Our Health? (Beacon Press, 2000)
 (with Harvard Medical School clinical ethicist and psychiatrist James E. Sabin, MD) Setting Limits Fairly: Can We Learn to Share Medical Resources? (Oxford, 2002;2nd ed., 2008; Published to Oxford Scholarship Online: September 2009) . DOI:10.1093/acprof:oso/9780195149364.001.0001
 Just Health: Meeting Health Needs Fairly (Cambridge, 2008).

[Source: Bibliography of books, from personal webpage, which also includes peer-reviewed journal articles and book chapters published since 1965]

See also
 American philosophy
 Clinton health care plan of 1993
 List of American philosophers
 List of Jewish American philosophers
 Thomas Reid, Scottish common sense realist

References

External links
 HSPH Faculty Site for Prof. Norm Daniels
 Publications of Prof. Norm Daniels
 'Norman Daniels Symposium' lectures/papers presented published in the Journal of Medical Ethics (January 2009, Volume 35, Number 1), published by British Medical Journal and the Institute of Medical Ethics
 HSPH-sponsored personal Faculty website for Prof. Norman O. Daniels, PhD

1942 births
Living people
American ethicists
Harvard Graduate School of Arts and Sciences alumni
Wesleyan University alumni
Alumni of Balliol College, Oxford
Harvard School of Public Health faculty
Hastings Center Fellows
American political philosophers
Social philosophers
Epistemologists
Tufts University School of Medicine faculty
Tufts University faculty
Members of the National Academy of Medicine